Carrots is a 1917 British silent crime film directed by Frank Wilson and starring Chrissie White, Lionelle Howard and Gerald Lawrence. 

A young female costermonger known as "Carrots" helps her policeman boyfriend thwart a criminal gang led by her own brother.

Selected filmography
 Chrissie White as Carrots 
 Lionelle Howard as Mike 
 Gerald Lawrence as PC Park  
 W.G. Saunders as Old Un' 
 Johnny Butt
 Gordon Begg as Nobby 
 Harry Gilbey

References

Bibliography
 Palmer, Scott. British Film Actors' Credits, 1895-1987. McFarland, 1988.

External links

1917 films
1917 crime films
British crime films
British silent feature films
Films directed by Frank Wilson
Films set in England
Hepworth Pictures films
British black-and-white films
1910s English-language films
1910s British films